Anthony J. Cirone is a percussionist who was with the San Francisco Symphony and Professor of Music at San Jose State University from 1965 to 2001. Cirone also taught at Stanford University from 1983 to 1992 and was Professor of Music and Chair of the Jacobs School of Music Percussion Department at Indiana University Bloomington from 2001 to 2007. He was inducted into the Percussive Arts Society Hall of Fame in 2007 and is part of Modern Drummer's Honor Roll, having been voted the Best Classical Percussionist over five years in a row.

Born in Jersey City, New Jersey, Cirone grew up in Lyndhurst, New Jersey and attended Lyndhurst High School, where he was encouraged to pursue more advanced music training.

Cirone composed the Portraits series for percussion, including Portraits in Rhythm, a collection of fifty snare drum etudes that are among the most popular for the instrument.

References

External links
 Official website
 Biography from the Percussive Arts Society Hall of Fame

American percussionists
Classical percussionists
American composers
1941 births
Indiana University Bloomington faculty
Juilliard School alumni
Living people
Lyndhurst High School alumni
People from Jersey City, New Jersey
People from Lyndhurst, New Jersey
San Jose State University faculty
Stanford University faculty